Fritz Kübert may refer to:

 Fritz Kübert (footballer, born 1906) (1906–1998), German footballer, committee member, youth coach and honorary member of Eintracht Frankfurt
 Fritz Kübert (footballer, born 1939) (1939–1997), German footballer of Eintracht Frankfurt

See also
 Kubert (disambiguation)